Schallenberg is a German surname. Notable people with the surname include:

Schallenberg family, Austrian noble family
 Alexander Schallenberg (born 1969), Chancellor of Austria
Wolfgang Schallenberg (1930–2023), Austrian diplomat, father of Alexander
Herbert, Count of Schallenberg (1901–1974), Austrian diplomat, father of Wolfgang and grandfather of Alexander
Edmund Schallenberg (1913–1999), American handball player
Kolja Schallenberg (born 1984), German theatre director
Ron Schallenberg (born  1998), German professional footballer

See also
Schallenberg Castle, ruined castle in Austria, namesake of the noble family
Schallenberg Pass, a mountain pass of Bern, Switzerland

German-language surnames